Craig Bolton (born 31 May 1980) is a former Australian rules footballer who played for the Brisbane Lions and the Sydney Swans in the Australian Football League (AFL). He often plays at full back or on the half back flank. He is unrelated to former Swans teammate Jude Bolton.

Playing career

Having played for the Eastlake Football Club in Canberra, and the NSW/ACT Under 18s team, Bolton was picked by Brisbane in the 3rd round of the 1998 AFL Draft. He was on the Lions' list from 1999 until 2002, making his debut against Carlton in Round 1 of the 2000 season. Being unable to gain a regular place in the very strong Brisbane team of the time forced Bolton to depart the club at the end of the 2002 season, managing only 29 games since his debut.

Bolton was selected by Sydney in the 2003 pre-season draft and was immediately given a starting role in the team. Quickly cementing his place in the side's backline, Bolton missed only one game in his first seven years with the Swans. His first three years with Sydney mirrored his time at Brisbane, with the Swans' making the preliminary finals in 2003, semi-finals in 2004 and the grand final in 2005. As opposed to his emergency listing for the 2001 and 2002 Grand Finals for the Lions, Bolton was now a regular member of the team for Sydney, and as such played a part in the Grand Final victory over West Coast, earning his first premiership medal, as well as finishing third in the club's Best and Fairest Award.

Gradually establishing himself as one of the AFL's standout defenders, Bolton was awarded a place in the 2006 All-Australian team on the half-back flank position, and again in the 2009 team at his preferred position of centre-half back. He also finished third in the Swans' 2007 Best and Fairest Award.

At the beginning of the 2008 season, Bolton was named Swans' co-captain, alongside Brett Kirk and Leo Barry. Later that year Bolton represented the Dream Team Australian rules football team in the Hall of Fame exhibition match at the MCG.

The latter half of his season in 2008 was somewhat restricted by a groin injury. After the Swans exited the finals, he travelled to Germany with teammate Adam Goodes for surgery.

In 2010, Bolton sustained a bad Achilles tendon injury against West Coast at the SCG in Round 5, ruling him out for the year.

On 24 March 2011, Bolton announced his immediate retirement after an ankle injury which would rule him out of the upcoming 2011 AFL season.

Media career
Following his playing career, Bolton commenced a media career as an Australian Rules Football commentator on ABC Local Radio and also a guest commentator of the sport on the Seven Network.

Career achievements

 International Rules Australian representative 2004
 Premiership player 2005
 3rd best and fairest 2005, 2007
 2006 All Australian
 2008 – present Co-Captain
 2009 All Australian

Statistics

|- style="background-color: #EAEAEA"
! scope="row" style="text-align:center" | 2000
|style="text-align:center;"|
| 26 || 15 || 7 || 4 || 120 || 41 || 161 || 54 || 6 || 0.5 || 0.3 || 8.0 || 2.7 || 10.7 || 3.6 || 0.4
|-
! scope="row" style="text-align:center" | 2001
|style="text-align:center;"|
| 26 || 8 || 3 || 2 || 48 || 33 || 81 || 23 || 8 || 0.4 || 0.3 || 6.0 || 4.1 || 10.1 || 2.9 || 1.0
|- style="background:#eaeaea;"
! scope="row" style="text-align:center" | 2002
|style="text-align:center;"|
| 26 || 6 || 0 || 1 || 24 || 17 || 41 || 9 || 7 || 0.0 || 0.2 || 4.0 || 2.8 || 6.8 || 1.5 || 1.2
|-
! scope="row" style="text-align:center" | 2003
|style="text-align:center;"|
| 6 || 24 || 0 || 0 || 177 || 108 || 285 || 93 || 35 || 0.0 || 0.0 || 7.4 || 4.5 || 11.9 || 3.9 || 1.5
|- style="background:#eaeaea;"
! scope="row" style="text-align:center" | 2004
|style="text-align:center;"|
| 6 || 24 || 6 || 0 || 164 || 106 || 270 || 81 || 57 || 0.3 || 0.0 || 6.8 || 4.4 || 11.3 || 3.4 || 2.4
|-
! scope="row" style="text-align:center" | 2005
|style="text-align:center;"|
| 6 || 26 || 1 || 3 || 211 || 137 || 348 || 112 || 62 || 0.0 || 0.1 || 8.1 || 5.3 || 13.4 || 4.3 || 2.4
|- style="background:#eaeaea;"
! scope="row" style="text-align:center" | 2006
|style="text-align:center;"|
| 6 || 24 || 3 || 4 || 245 || 104 || 349 || 144 || 59 || 0.1 || 0.2 || 10.2 || 4.3 || 14.5 || 6.0 || 2.5
|-
! scope="row" style="text-align:center" | 2007
|style="text-align:center;"|
| 6 || 23 || 3 || 2 || 244 || 110 || 354 || 138 || 40 || 0.1 || 0.1 || 10.6 || 4.8 || 15.4 || 6.0 || 1.7
|- style="background:#eaeaea;"
! scope="row" style="text-align:center" | 2008
|style="text-align:center;"|
| 6 || 24 || 2 || 1 || 249 || 153 || 402 || 148 || 45 || 0.1 || 0.0 || 10.4 || 6.4 || 16.8 || 6.2 || 1.9
|-
! scope="row" style="text-align:center" | 2009
|style="text-align:center;"|
| 6 || 20 || 0 || 0 || 188 || 140 || 328 || 101 || 31 || 0.0 || 0.0 || 9.4 || 7.0 || 16.4 || 5.1 || 1.6
|- style="background:#eaeaea;"
! scope="row" style="text-align:center" | 2010
|style="text-align:center;"|
| 6 || 5 || 0 || 0 || 26 || 33 || 59 || 11 || 9 || 0.0 || 0.0 || 5.2 || 6.6 || 11.8 || 2.2 || 1.8
|- class="sortbottom"
! colspan=3| Career
! 199
! 25
! 17
! 1696
! 982
! 2678
! 914
! 359
! 0.1
! 0.1
! 8.5
! 4.9
! 13.5
! 4.6
! 1.8
|}

References

External links

Sydney Swans site player profile

1980 births
Living people
Brisbane Lions players
Sydney Swans players
Sydney Swans Premiership players
All-Australians (AFL)
Australian rules footballers from the Australian Capital Territory
NSW/ACT Rams players
Eastlake Football Club players
Australia international rules football team players
One-time VFL/AFL Premiership players
Australian rules football commentators